This is a list of current semi-automated train systems capable of GoA2 as according to the Grade of Automation classifications specified by the standard IEC 62290‐1. These are explained diagrammatically by the UITP. For the systems capable of GoA3 and higher, see the list of driver-less train systems. Canceled automated train systems are in the list of defunct automated train systems.

Africa

Americas

Asia

Europe

Oceania

Future systems

Americas

Asia

Europe

Oceania

See also
 Automatic Train Operation
 Automated guided vehicle
 Jane's World Railways
 Communications-based train control

Notes

References

External links
 "UITP Automated Metro Observatory, a complete website with UTO Metro Resources"

Lists of railway lines
Public transport
Rail infrastructure
Automated